Frank Lomas Hyde (11 January 1927 – 11 May 2004) was an English professional footballer who played as a goalkeeper.

Career
Born in Wath-upon-Dearne, Hyde spent four years in the Royal Navy and worked as a wages clerk at Manvers colliery. While playing for Wath Athletic he was spotted by a scout, and signed for Wolverhampton Wanderers. He signed for Bradford City in December 1948. He had previously During his time with Bradford City he made 34 appearances in the Football League, as well as one appearance in the FA Cup. He left the club in July 1952 to sign for Scarborough. He later played for Selby Town, Bridlington Town, Frickley Athletic and Denaby United, and he was also manager of Mexborough Town.

Sources

References

1927 births
2004 deaths
English footballers
Wath Athletic F.C. players
Wolverhampton Wanderers F.C. players
Bradford City A.F.C. players
Scarborough F.C. players
Selby Town F.C. players
Bridlington Town A.F.C. players
Frickley Athletic F.C. players
Denaby United F.C. players
English Football League players
Association football goalkeepers
English football managers